Gesta is a peer-reviewed academic journal in the area of medieval art. It was established in 1963 and is published by the University of Chicago Press. The editors-in-chief are Diane J. Reilly (Indiana University Bloomington) and Susan L. Boynton (Columbia University).

External links 
 
 Gesta at the International Center of Medieval Art

Art history journals
Medieval art
Publications established in 1963
English-language journals
Biannual journals
University of Chicago Press academic journals